The Great Cumbrian Run is an annual half marathon road running event held in Carlisle, Cumbria, United Kingdom.
Dave Cannon finished first in the inaugural Cumbrian Run in 1982 completing the course in 1:05:06 while
Francis Bowen of Kenya holds the race record of 1:03:35 achieved in 2004.

Course

Recent winners

References

External links
 

Half marathons in the United Kingdom
Recurring sporting events established in 1982
Sport in Cumbria
1982 establishments in England